Harvey Brooks (August 5, 1915 – May 28, 2004) was an American physicist, "a pioneer in incorporating science into public policy",

notable for helping to shape national science policies and who served on science advisory committees in the administrations of Presidents Dwight D. Eisenhower, John F. Kennedy, and Lyndon B. Johnson.

Brooks was also notable for his contributions to the fundamental theory of semiconductors and the band structure of metals.
Brooks was dean of the Division of Engineering and Applied Sciences of the Harvard University.

Brooks was also the founder and editor-in-chief of the International Journal of Physics and Chemistry of Solids. He was elected to the National Academy of Engineering "for technical contributions to solid-state engineering and nuclear reactors; leadership in national technological decisions".
He was also Gordon McKay Professor of Applied Physics and Benjamin Peirce Professor of Technology and Public Policy at Harvard University.

Honors and awards
Brooks was president of the American Academy of Arts and Sciences and a member of the National Academy of Sciences, the National Academy of Engineering,  the American Philosophical Society, and the Council on Foreign Relations.

He received the Ernest O. Lawrence Award of the Atomic Energy Commission, the Philip Hauge Abelson Prize of the American Association for the Advancement of Science.

Chronology 
 1915: born in Cleveland, Ohio on August 5
 1937: B.S. in mathematics, Yale University
 1940: Ph.D in physics, Harvard University
 1945: married to Helen G. Lathrop on October 20
 1940–1946: faculty member, Harvard University
 1946–1950: Associate Head of the Knolls Atomic Power Laboratory, General Electric
 1950–1957: Gordon McKay Professor of Applied Physics, Harvard University
 1957–1975: Dean, the Division of Engineering and Applied Sciences (DEAS), Harvard University
 1961: Elected to the American Philosophical Society
 1962: Elected to the National Academy of Sciences
 2004: death

References 

1915 births
2004 deaths
20th-century American physicists
Harvard University faculty
Harvard Graduate School of Arts and Sciences alumni
Yale College alumni
Members of the United States National Academy of Engineering
Members of the United States National Academy of Sciences
Scientists from Cleveland
Fellows of the American Physical Society
Members of the National Academy of Medicine
Members of the American Philosophical Society